United Nations Security Council resolution 843, adopted unanimously on 18 June 1993, after reaffirming Resolution 724 (1991) and Article 50 of the United Nations Charter, the council was conscious of the fact that an increasing number of requests for assistance have been received under Article 50.

Article 50 states that if any state is affected economically by preventive or enforcement measures undertaken by the security council against another state, the former state has a right to consult the council to find a solution to the problems. The committee established in Resolution 724 was confirmed with carrying out tasks relating to Article 50 and was invited to make recommendations to the President of the Security Council for appropriate action.

See also
 Breakup of Yugoslavia
 List of United Nations Security Council Resolutions 801 to 900 (1993–1994)
 Yugoslav Wars

References

External links
 
Text of the Resolution at undocs.org

 0843
 0843
1993 in Yugoslavia
 0843
June 1993 events